Joe Gresko is an American Democratic Party politician currently serving as a member of the Connecticut House of Representatives from the 121st district, which includes part of Stratford, since 2016. Gresko was first elected in a 2016 special election to replace former representative Terry Backer after previously being the spokesman for Bridgeport mayor Joe Ganim. Gresko was re-elected in 2018 over Republican Robert Mitchell. And again in 2020, over Republican Ed Scinto. Gresko currently serves as a member of the House Energy and Technology Committee, and co-chair of the Environment Committee.

References

External links

Living people
Democratic Party members of the Connecticut House of Representatives
People from Stratford, Connecticut
21st-century American politicians
Central Connecticut State University alumni
Year of birth missing (living people)